Before the Act of Union 1707, the barons of the constabulary of Haddington (now called East Lothian) elected commissioners to represent them in the unicameral Parliament of Scotland and in the Convention of Estates. The number of commissioners was increased from two to four in 1690.

After 1708, Haddingtonshire returned one member to the House of Commons of Great Britain and later to the House of Commons of the United Kingdom.

List of commissioners

 1593 parliament and convention: — Hepburn, laird of Waughton
 1594 parliament and convention: — Hepburn, laird of Waughton
 1598 convention: — Hepburn, laird of Waughton
 1599 convention: — Hepburn, laird of Waughton
 1605: Sir Archibald Douglas of Whittingehame
 1605: William Douglas of Whittingehame
 1605 parliament and convention: — Hepburn, laird of Waughton
 1607: Sir Archibald Douglas of Whittingehame
 1608: Sir Archibald Douglas of Whittingehame
 1609 convention: — Hepburn, laird of Waughton
 1612: Sir James Douglas of Spott
 1612: Sir Alexander Hamilton of Innerwick
 1617 parliament and convention: Sir John Home of North Berwick
 1617 parliament and convention: Sir William Seton
 1621: Sir Robert Hepburn
 1622: John Hamilton of Preston
 1625 convention: Archibald Acheson of Gosford
 1625 convention: Sir John Seton
 1628–1633: John Hamilton of Preston
 1628–1633: Sir Patrick Murray of Elibank
 1630 convention: Sir Robert Richardson of Pencaitland
 1639–1641: Sir John Hamilton of Preston
 1639–1641: Sir Patrick Hepburn of Waughton
 1640–1641: Sir Patrick Murray of Elibank
 1643–1644 convention: Sir Adam Hepburn of Humbie
 1643–1644 convention: Sir Patrick Hepburn of Waughton
 1644–1645: Sir John St Clair of Hermistoun
 1644–1647: — Cockburn, laird of Clerkington (possibly son of Sir Richard Cockburn of Clerkington)
 1644–1647: Sir William Scott of Clerkingtoun
 1645–1647: Sir John Hamilton of Biel
 1648: Sir Adam Hepburn of Humbie
 1648: Sir William Scott of Clerkingtoun
 1648–1649: John Cockburn of Ormiston
 1649–1651: Robert Hepburn of Keith
 1650: John Hepburn of Waughton
 1650: Sir Alexander Hope of Grantoun
 1650–1651: Sir Adam Hepburn of Humbie
 1661–1663: Sir Thomas Hamilton of Preston
 1661–1663: Sir Peter Wedderburn of Gosford
 1665 convention: Sir Thomas Hamilton of Preston
 1665 convention: Sir Peter Wedderburn of Gosford
 1667 convention: Sir Thomas Hamilton of Preston
 1667 convention: Sir Peter Wedderburn of Gosford
 1669–1674: Sir James Hay of Linplum
 1669–1674: Sir Peter Wedderburn of Gosford
 1669–1674: John Hay, sheriff-depute
 1678 convention: Adam Cockburn of Ormiston
 1678 convention: James Fletcher of Salton
 1681–1682: Adam Cockburn of Ormiston
 1681–1682: Andrew Fletcher of Saltoun
 1685–1686: Sir John Lauder of Fountainhall
 1685–1686: John Wedderburn of Gosford
 1689 convention: Adam Cockburn of Ormiston
 1689 convention: Sir Robert Sinclair of Stevenston
 1689–1692: Adam Cockburn of Ormiston (vacated on appointment as Lord Justice Clerk, 28 November 1692)
 1689–1702: Sir Robert Sinclair of Stevenston
 1690–1702: Sir John Lauder of Fountainhall
 1690–1702: William Morison of Prestongrange
 1693–1702: William Hepburn of Beinstoun
 1702–1707: Andrew Fletcher of Saltoun
 1702–1707: John Cockburn, younger of Ormiston
 1702–1707: Sir John Lauder of Fountainhall
 1702–1707: William Nisbet of Dirleton
In February 1707, Cockburn and Nisbet were elected by the other shire commissioners to serve among the Scottish representatives to the first Parliament of Great Britain.

References
 Joseph Foster, Members of Parliament, Scotland (2nd edition, 1882)

Constituencies of the Parliament of Scotland (to 1707)
Politics of East Lothian
History of East Lothian
1707 disestablishments in Scotland
Constituencies disestablished in 1707